Mary Seymour (30 August 1548 – c. 1550), born at her father’s country seat, Sudeley Castle in Gloucestershire, was the only daughter of Thomas Seymour, 1st Baron Seymour of Sudeley, and Catherine Parr, widow of Henry VIII of England. Although Catherine was married four times, Mary was her only child. Complications from Mary's birth would claim the life of her mother on 5 September 1548, and her father was executed less than a year later for treason against Edward VI.

In 1549, the Parliament of England passed an Act (3 & 4 Edw. 6 C A P. XIV) removing the attainder placed on her father from Mary, but his lands remained property of the Crown.

As her mother's wealth was left entirely to her father and later confiscated by the Crown, Mary was left a destitute orphan in the care of Katherine Willoughby, Duchess of Suffolk, who appears to have resented this imposition. After 1550 Mary disappears from historical record completely, and no claim was ever made on her father's meagre estate, leading to the conclusion that she did not live past the age of two.

Survival speculations
Victorian author Agnes Strickland claimed, in her biography of Catherine Parr, that Mary Seymour did survive to adulthood, and in fact married Sir Edward Bushel, a member of the household of Anne of Denmark, wife of King James I. Strickland's theory suggested that the Dowager Duchess of Suffolk, after her marriage to Richard Bertie in 1553, and before she fled England during the Marian Persecutions in or after 1555, arranged Mary's marriage to Bushel. The problem with this theory is that Mary would have been aged six at the time.

Another theory states that Mary was removed to Wexford, Ireland, and raised under the care of a Protestant family there, the Harts, who had been engaged in piracy off the Irish coast under the protection of a profit sharing arrangement with Thomas Seymour. A lozenge-shaped ring inscribed "What I have I hold" was reputed to have been an early gift to Thomas by his brother Edward Seymour, and was passed down through generations of the Seymour-Harts until at least 1927.

There was reference to "Mary" found in old Elizabethan texts of 'The Late Queen's heir.' However, this could be various other women. Historian S. Joy states that "Mary definitely lived past the age of 10, but after that little is known."

A more modern theory, from Linda Porter, author of a 2010 biography on Katherine Parr, suggests that a 1573 Latin book of poems and epitaphs written by John Parkhurst, Katherine Parr’s chaplain, contains the following reference to Mary:

I whom at the cost
Of her own life
My queenly mother
Bore with the pangs of labour
Sleep under this marble
An unfit traveller.

If Death had given me to live longer
That virtue, that modesty, That obedience of my excellent Mother
That Heavenly courageous nature
Would have lived again in me.

Now, whoever
You are, fare thee well
Because I cannot speak any more, this stone
Is a memorial to my brief life.

Porter suggested that this was an epitaph written by Parkhurst, on the occasion of Mary's death around the age of two. Porter further speculates that Mary is buried in Lincolnshire, near Grimsthorpe, the estate owned by the Duchess of Suffolk, "where she had lived as an unwelcome burden for most of her short, sad life."

Portrayals in fiction
The 2007 novel The Red Queen's Daughter by Jacqueline Kolosov speculates an alternative history where Mary Seymour becomes lady-in-waiting to Queen Elizabeth I. The 2009 novel The Stolen One by Suzanne Crowley depicts Mary being raised by a 'witch' in the English countryside. A similar premise allows Seymour's supernatural powers to help her friend Alison Bannister search for her lost child in the 2016 novel The Phantom Tree by Nicola Cornick.

The 2022 drama series Becoming Elizabeth portrays Mary’s birth.

References

External links
 History Today: Lady Mary Seymour, an Unfit Traveller by Linda Porter.

1548 births
Year of death unknown
16th-century English women
Mary
Parr family
Catherine Parr